Hereditary politicians refers to politicians (especially modern politicians) whose political position can be seen as being conferred by or based on inheritance from a parent or grandparent in some sense.

It should not be confused with political dynasty though these two concepts are not mutually exclusive. Political dynasty or political family simply means that several members of the same family (whether related by blood or marriage) are involved in politics, regardless of the type of office. Thus, hereditary politician can be said to be a more specific subset of political dynasty as it refers to the next generation/s gaining the same political office as their parent or grandparent.

Factors enabling political office to be passed down

Name recognition
According to Oscar Wilde, "There is only one thing in the world worse than being talked about, and that is not being talked about." This might be especially true for politicians. When the name of a politician is already familiar to the public then they tend to choose him over someone who is relatively unknown. This phenomenon is commonly referred to as Mere-exposure effect in social psychology. This could also be something as superficial as choosing the most familiar-sounding name on the ballot either because of indecision or ignorance of the candidates' campaign platforms.

In a study done by Vanderbilt University professors, they found out that name recognition affects candidate support as they are exposed to subliminal cues. They found evidence that mere exposure to the name of their hypothetical candidate improved perceived viability of the candidate and in turn, increased their support.

The voting public could also see the parent's previous accomplishment as something that the children can or will also accomplish. For example, before being elected as a President of the Philippines, Benigno (Noynoy) Aquino III was not very popular to the majority of Filipinos and did not have any major contributions as a senator compared to his contemporaries. However, he was propelled into mainstream public consciousness and became a mainstay in news stories when his mother, the first female president Corazon Aquino suddenly died. With the country in mourning and in the mood to reminisce the past – which included his father, the assassinated Benigno (Ninoy) Aquino Jr. – Noynoy won the presidential election. It was neither because of his charismatic personality nor his achievements as a senator but because he is the son of the country's two major political figures.

Existing political network
Having a politician parent almost guarantee a certain degree of success for an individual as not only does he inherit the valuable name recognition, but also benefits from the social networks and resources that are already established. The political ties that his parent has cultivated in the past will also be of use to the offspring particularly when it comes to campaigning, forming political parties and fundraising. In Japan, for example, the patronage system is prevalent especially in the form of "support groups" or koenkai.

Authoritarian personalized regime
In an authoritarian regime where the public has no real voice when it comes to choosing the state's leader, it is therefore inevitable that the successor would simply be the one of the family heirs. This is apparent in North Korea where its first leader, Kim Il-sung, developed a cult of personality and familism as a means of political control. The highest status in the nation has been ascribed to the Kim dynasty, requiring "proper" respect and devotion from its citizens. Various accomplishments, even if irrelevant, are usually ascribed to the Kim family.

Notable families

Japan
Hereditary politics is prevalent in Japan because political families hold on to three-bans, jiban, kanban, and kaban (financial support), which are three essential resources for a candidate to win an election. Jiban is the personal support from the people in a district. Kanban literally translates into advertisement board which symbolizes fame. Lastly, kaban means "bag" in Japanese and this refers to the financial support to run an election.

A hereditary politician is considered as a structural feature for Japanese politics. It is reported that approximately 30 percent of the House of Representatives are Nisei, who are the second-generation of the Diet member. Nisei population takes up to 40 percent of the Liberal Democratic Party (LDP). Furthermore, most Japanese Prime Ministers have a strong political background. Famous examples are Junichiro Koizumi, Yasuo Fukuda, and Shinzo Abe.

Nobusuke Kishi was criticized for the Manchukuo labor scandal which he had exploited Chinese workers in order to channel profits for Japan. His life was described as mirroring the US-JP relationship before and after the war: from enemy to allies. Mr. Nobusuke was condemned as a war criminal by the Americans, but later, he became the main negotiator for a peaceful relationship with the US. Therefore, he was referred as America's Favorite War Criminal.

Kan Abe served in the House of Representatives (Japan) from 1937 to 1946. He is famous for running the opposing platform to oppose to the militaristic government which was under Hideki Tojo’s control.

Shinzo continued his grandfather's proposal of amending the current Japanese Constitution which restricts Japan's use of military forces. Even though this topic is very controversial within the society, Shinzo has always been assertive about the revision. He is also famous for his economic reforms known as the Abenomics. He had been involved in several scandals such as the veterinary school scandal which greatly decreased his approval poll rating. However, his strong attitude towards the North Korea crisis had helped his party win the majority seats in the 2017 Japanese general election.

Fukuda Takeo's response to the terrorist hijacking incident, Japan Airlines Flight 472 (1977), drew international controversies. Unlike how Western countries would refuse hijackers’ demands, Fukuda accepted their demands based on the principle that "human life outweighs the earth."

Fukuda Yasuo, the eldest son of Fukuda Takeo, became the Prime Minister after Shinzo Abe's abrupt resignation. Less than one year in office, Mr. Fukuda had to step down his position due to ongoing involvement in political scandals such as the missing pension scandal which caused a steep decrease in his personal popularity.

Hatoyama Ichirō was elected as the first Liberal Democratic Party (Japan) President during the 1956 party convention. One of his famous diplomatic goal was to restore relationship with the Soviet Union. As a post war Prime Minister, his central proposal was to strengthen national political and economical independence. Hatoyama gained high popularity and helped the party win 185 seats in the election. This was later referred as the "Hatoyama boom."

Hatoyama Yukio, like his grandfather, had entered his career as a Prime Minister with high popularity. Unfortunately, his public approval rating fell rapidly as he could not fulfill the high expectations his party had promised. One significant example is the broken promise to relocate the American Military base in Okinawa. This incident was the main reason why Mr. Hatoyama resigned from the Prime Minister position within less than a year after he was elected.

Indonesia

North Korea

Philippines
Political families started becoming more apparent in the national political scene after World War II and gradually turned into hereditary politics, especially in the provinces. In 1946, Vicente Sotto became a senator after his brother Filemon Sotto previously held a position in the Senate before the war. The 60s saw more frequent instances of relatives getting elected in the Senate such as the election of the brother of then President Ramon Magsaysay; of Magnolia Antonino as Senator after her husband Senator Gaudencio died; of Sergio Osmeña Jr. who was the son of 4th President Sergio Osmeña Sr.; of Gerardo Roxas who was another son of a previous president; and of Benigno Aquino Jr. who was the son of Benigno Sr. During the martial law years, it only became worse as Marcos named his wife Imelda as the governor of Metro Manila while his son Bongbong became the governor of Ilocos Norte.

In 2014, talks about an anti-political dynasty bill surfaced but it was not received favorably by the public as it was seen as a watered down version that will not eliminate the monopoly of the elites on the political scene.

Corazon Aquino was the wife of former Senator Benigno "Ninoy" Aquino who was assassinated during Martial Law, sparking the celebrated People Power Revolution. Cory, as she was fondly referred to, was then elected as the first female president of the Philippines and oversaw the creation of the 1987 Constitution. She was named 1987 Woman of the Year by Time Magazine and served for one term in office before being succeeded by Fidel Ramos. In 2008, she was diagnosed with cancer and died one year after. Cory's funeral procession took over 8 hours as thousands of Filipinos took to the streets to pay their last respects, a proof of her popularity among the public.

Coincidentally, the year she died was the year when political parties started floating names for their presidential candidates. Since Cory Aquino's legacy was still fresh in the public's mind, the Liberal Party took advantage of the resurgence of Aquino's popularity and named her son Noynoy Aquino as their presidential candidate in place of Mar Roxas, the previously announced standard-bearer of the party. Noynoy Aquino eventually won the 2010 presidential elections.

Rodrigo Duterte started serving as mayor of Davao City in 1988 winning consecutive terms until 1998. He is known for his strict implementation of law and order policies and became well known for his apparent success in lowering the crime rate of Davao. Digong, as he is known by his constituents, issued orders regarding alcohol consumption, prostitution, smoking and firecrackers. However, he has long been suspected to be the mastermind behind the infamous vigilante group Davao Death Squad who arbitrarily kills suspected criminals. As the current president of the Philippines, Rodrigo has been under fire for his war on drugs campaign which reportedly leads to extrajudicial killings.

During Rodrigo's 2007–2010 term, his daughter Sara Duterte was elected as the vice mayor. On the succeeding term of 2010–2013, they switched offices: Sara was the one who was elected mayor, while her father was elected as the vice mayor. On the next term of 2013–2016, Rodrigo was elected mayor again, but this time, his vice mayor was his son Paolo Duterte.

Joseph Estrada, commonly known as "Erap", became famous as a film actor from 1956 to 1989, starring in hundreds of movies and even founding the celebrated annual Metro Manila Film Festival. His popularity as an actor obviously served him well in his venture in politics starting in 1969 when he was elected mayor of San Juan and eventually rising to the highest office in the nation as the 13th President of the Philippines in 1998. Erap assumed office during the Asian Financial Crisis and his administration was marred by various controversies. His term in office was consequently cut short when he was accused of graft and corruption and underwent an impeachment trial in 2001. However, before the trial was even concluded, he was ousted from office by the Second second People Power Revolution. He was charged with plunder and was found guilty with a sentence of lifetime imprisonment making him the first Philippine president to get impeached and convicted.

In 2007, after 6 years of being detained, Erap was pardoned by President Gloria Macapagal Arroyo. He was granted executive clemency in exchange for a commitment that he will no longer seek public office. However, Erap ran again as a presidential candidate during the 2010 election with Jejomar Binay as his vice president but lost to Noynoy Aquino.

Meanwhile, his son Jinggoy followed his footsteps as he was elected mayor of San Juan in 1992 when he was 29 years old which made him the youngest elected mayor in the country. Jinggoy stayed in office until 2001, the year when his father was ousted as president. Then in 2004 he was elected as a senator and rose to the position of Senate president pro tempore after 3 years. Unfortunately, Jinggoy was also charged with plunder when the PDAF Scam involving Janet Lim-Napoles was exposed in 2013. He was released in September 2017 after posting Php 1.33 million in bail.

Diosdado Macapagal was the 9th Philippine President whose administration worked to prevent corruption. His reforms were however impeded by Congress which was then led by politicians from Nacionalista Party, a rival of Liberal Party where Diosdado belonged. Diosdado was also known for changing the date for the celebration of Philippine Independence – from July 4 to June 12.

In an interview with Time before Estrada was ousted from office in 2001, Gloria said: "I will follow my father's footsteps in doing what is right, and God will take care of the rest. My father is my role model." Ironically, when Gloria was elected as the 14th Philippine President, her administration was marred by scandals, accusations of corruption and electoral fraud.

Gloria's rise to presidency came about because of the Second People Power Revolution where then President Estrada was ousted. Being then the Vice President, Gloria was sworn in as the new president. She then ran during the 2004 presidential election and won with just over 3% margin – the closest in Philippine presidential election. Her slim margin of victory over a popular actor-candidate Fernando Poe Jr. gave rise to suspicions of cheating. It came to a head when audio recordings of then Election Commissioner Virgilio Garcillano and Gloria was released in 2005 despite government threats. The audio recording was of a phone call where Gloria allegedly gave Garcillano instructions to rig the elections in her favor. In what became as the Hello Garci scandal, Gloria gave a televised address where she denied accusations of cheating but admitted that it was her voice on the audio recording, prompting protests and calls for impeachment.

Ferdinand Marcos was infamous for placing the country under martial law from 1972 to 1981 and suppressing civil liberties during his time in office as the 10th President of the Philippines. However, his rise to power began when he was elected Representative of his hometown Ilocos Norte from 1949 to 1959. Shortly thereafter he moved on to become a Senator from 1959 to 1965. This path was closely followed by his son Bongbong as the latter was also elected, first as Representative of Ilocos Norte for two terms, and then as Senator from 2010 to 2016. Meanwhile, his daughter Imee who also got elected as Representative of Ilocos Norte from 1998 to 2007 did not go on to become a Senator but was instead elected as the provincial governor in 2010.

Whereas Ferdinand got elected as the President in 1965 – defeating incumbent Diosdado Macapagal – and holding the office for a total of 21 years, his son Bongbong did not run for presidency. Instead, he ran as a vice-presidential candidate under the Nacionalista Party during the 2016 presidential elections where he lost by merely 263,473 votes to Leni Robredo.

France

President of the National Front Jean-Marie Le Pen and Councillor Marine Le Pen who is daughter of the former, followed by Marion Maréchal-Le Pen, Jean-Marie Le Pen's granddaughter. Also, Le Pen parent and child has served as the leader of the same party over two generations.

Singapore

Lee Kuan Yew was famous for founding the country of Singapore in 1965 after it was expelled as a state of Malaysia following racial strife and economic disagreements with others states. He assumed leadership of the newly created government of Singapore after its independence, though he sadly expressed in a speech his desire to have been united with Malaysia. Kuan Yew was credited with the rise of Singapore as a developed country and was deemed a great statesman as he led the country for 31 years. His legacy included reducing the unemployment rate, increasing the GNP and increasing literacy rates. He remained influential even after retirement.

Kuan Yew reportedly did not want a cult of personality to develop in the country so he willed that his house in 38 Oxley Road be demolished after he dies. However, his son Hsien Loong, who is the current prime minister, got into a publicized dispute with his siblings regarding their father's house. Accused by his siblings of abusing his powers by preserving their father's house, Hsien Loong decided to deliver a speech to refute them.

South Korea

Park Chung-hee served as the third president of South Korea from 1963 until he was assassinated in 1979 by the director of the Korean Central Intelligence Agency (KCIA). Park had been a controversial political figure in Korea. During Park's presidency, he had sustained the rapid economic growth in South Korea which people often refer to as the Miracle on the Han River. On the other hand, he had been an authoritarian dictator who oppressed opposition parties and civil liberties.

Park Chung-hee's daughter, Park Geun-hye, became the first female president in South Korea. Older Koreans who hold nostalgia toward the presidency of Park Geun-hye's father highly contributed to her success in the 2012 presidential election. Unlike her father's 18 years of authoritarian rule, Park Geun-hye ended her term in office in 2017 after a major influence and bribery scandal was exposed.

Taiwan
During the 2016 legislative election, among 365 candidates 63 of them came from a political family. Furthermore, among those who came from a political family, 40 of them were children of a former politician. Within the 22 cities and counties in Taiwan, the percentage of politicians having political background is 24.6%.

After the 2014 Sunflower Student Movement, there are rising voices from the people for a political landscape change. This came along with the public favoring younger forces into the political arena. Thus, both KMT and Democratic Progressive Party attempt to refresh their party by recruiting new members. However, it is not easy for them to appeal to younger people to join politics; therefore, parties look inwards for second generations.

The Chiang family is the most prominent political family in Taiwan. Their historical meaning to Taiwan is very controversial as they helped thrived the Taiwanese economy but at the same time had been highly oppressive toward civil liberty. The Martial law in Taiwan was enacted in 1948 and lasted till 1987 when Chiang Ching-kuo finally called an end to it. Taiwan had been under the restriction of the Martial law for more than 38 years making it the world's second longest Martial law. During this period of time, many innocent people were accused of being spies from the Chinese Communist. Many intellectuals were restricted or even killed. In order to avoid being mistaken as spies from China, people were careful not to talk about taboo topics such as the White Terror and the February 28 Incident.

Taiwan's economic miracle is highly contributed to Chiang Ching-kuo's (at that time the primer of Taiwan) policy, the Ten Major Construction Projects, a government introduced economic developing plan. These ten massive building projects improved basic infrastructures and upgraded the Taiwanese industry which later on played an important role in the Taiwan Miracle)

The Three-noes Policy was the diplomatic relationship with China during President Chiang Ching-kuo. These three noes includes: no contact, no compromises and no negotiation with the Chinese Communists.

Criticisms
One of the biggest harms of hereditary politicians is corruption or bribery, something that is especially common for countries like the Philippines with its political power and economic powers highly intertwined. The concentration of political power "perpetuates a culture of dependency between an economically/politically dominant patron" which often leads to corruptions and bribery.

Moreover, hereditary political families tend to pass down their ideology and previous works from one generation to another. This suggests that the new generation is likely to be trapped by their family preoccupations. For instance, the Prime Minister of Japan, Shinzō Abe, has been eagerly pushing the revision of the Constitution of Japan, a policy which he inherited from his grandfather. Many regard Abe's assertive attitude to revise the Constitution as his political weakness. Also, political families tend to have strong dependency with specific interest groups within the society. In order to maintain the relationship, it becomes difficult for politicians to make reforms which may challenge the interest of their support groups.

There is also the so-called Carnegie effect describes the effect of how inherited fame and political network may decrease one's incentive to work hard. Most hereditary politicians were able to get a political position with relatively less effort compare to those who had no political background. Inherited advantages impede one's ambition to enrich himself. For instance, hereditary candidates have inherited political connections from their predecessors; therefore, they do not need to work hard for bureaucratic or academic competence in order to gain their position.

Difference from political dynasty
Hereditary politics is characterized by a son/daughter or grandson/daughter gaining an office that was once held by his parent (or grandparent). In comparison, political dynasty is different from hereditary politicians as the former is characterized by either of the following: 1) Members of the same family (simultaneously) holding the same government positions but in different districts; or 2) Members of the same family (simultaneously or successively) holding various government positions.

Philippines

An example of political dynasty which might look similar to hereditary politics is the Ampatuan family in the Philippines. A prominent political family in Maguindanao, a province in southern Philippines, the Ampatuans exercised great power in the region. Its patriarch named Andal Sr. was elected as governor from 2001 to 2008. During the 2007 general elections, he ran unopposed. Meanwhile, his son Zaldy Ampatuan was in office as governor of the ARMM, an administrative region where Maguindanao belongs, from 2005 to 2009.

Another of Andal's sons, former mayor of Datu Unsay Andal Jr., was supposed to run as governor of Maguindanao during the 2010 general elections. However, the whole Ampatuan family came under fire after their political rival Esmael Mangudadatu was ambushed along with over 50 people that included journalists, lawyers, relatives and civilians who happened to be on the same place. Mangudadatu and his convoy was about to file his certificate of candidacy to run against Ampatuan for the gubernatorial office when they were reportedly attacked by 100 armed men. An estimated 58 individuals were killed during the incident, including 32 journalists. Dubbed as the "single deadliest event for the press" since the CPJ started keeping records, this incident prevented the younger Ampatuan from running for office and resulted to his incarceration.

China

The current General Secretary of the Chinese Communist Party, Xi Jinping, is both a member of the Princeling and the second red generation. Xi's father, Xi Zhongxun was considered as the first generation of Chinese leadership which he served as the vice premier. Xi's rise in political power was said to be supported by the princeling and the second red generation faction. However, unexpectedly, Xi had been reported to distance himself from those factions by expanding "commoners" within his new political team. There are only two people (Xi and Zhang Youxia) who are descendants of the second-generation red among the 25 members of the CCP Politburo.

Current Chinese Premier Li Keqiang was once deemed as the most potential successor of former CCP General Secretary Hu Jintao. However, Li did not succeed because he does not have a deeply-rooted political family background. On the other hand, Xi Jinping became the successor of Mr. Hu with the support of a strong political network which he inherited from his father, Xi Zhongxun, who had been a senior political leader for more than 50 years.

The history of China’s aristocratic class can be traced back to the period when China was under the control of Mao Zedong. Mao's army received a lot of aid from the south; one significant example was the southern general, Ye Jianying. During the conflict between Zhang's Fourth Front Army and Mao's First Front Army, Ye warned Mao in advance that Zhang Guotao is planning to overthrow Mao. Later on, during the Long March Ye came to aid Moa by assisting Liu Bocheng in directing the crossing of the Yangtze river without losing a man. Mao highly appreciated his contributions to the Chinese Communist Party. In return for Ye's contributions, Mao protected Ye during the Cultural Revolution and gave him a lot of political power. Ye was said to have 'paved the way for the country's move to a more market-oriented economy and created a political dynasty that still plays kingmaker'. Ye was described as having the ability to 'influence national policy and protect its sprawling business empire in southern China.’ Ye Jianying's political influence continued even after his death as his children had high influences on the Chinese politics. One concrete example was when his children ‘attempted to help block a vocal advocate economic change from joining the CCP Politburo Standing Committee because it was not attentive to their interest.’

See also
 Hereditary monarchy
 Political dynasties in the Philippines
 Political family
 Nepotism

References

Elections
 
Politicians of Asian nations
Asian political history